DD HD (Doordarshan High Definition) is High Definition service of DD National channel of Indian public broadcaster Doordarshan.

References

Hindi-language television channels in India
Television channels and stations established in 2010
Television channels and stations established in 2015
Hindi-language television stations
Television channels based in Noida
2015 establishments in Uttar Pradesh